Andrei Vladislavovich Popov (born 15 July 1988) is a Russian professional ice hockey right winger who is currently an unrestricted free agent. He most recently played for Traktor Chelyabinsk of the Kontinental Hockey League (KHL).

Playing career
Popov was selected by the Philadelphia Flyers in the 7th round (205th overall) of the 2006 NHL Entry Draft. He made his professional debut with Traktor Chelyabinsk in the Russian Superleague during the 2006–07 season. 

Popov spent the entirety of his first 13 seasons of his career within Traktor Chelyabinsk, before leaving as a free agent following the 2015–16 season. On June 1, 2016, Popov agreed to an initial two-year contract to continue in the KHL with Ak Bars Kazan.

After helping Ak Bars claim the Gagarin Cup in 2018, Popov left after three seasons and returned to original club, Traktor Chelyabinsk, on a one-year contract on 10 July 2019.

Career statistics

Regular season and playoffs

International

Awards and honours

References

External links

Andrei Popov's profile at HockeysFuture.com

1988 births
Living people
Ak Bars Kazan players
Sportspeople from Chelyabinsk
Philadelphia Flyers draft picks
Russian ice hockey right wingers
Traktor Chelyabinsk players